Heaven v Pender (1883) (11 QBD 503, Court of Appeal) was an English tort law case, which foreshadowed the birth of the modern law of negligence.

Facts
Pender was the owner of a dry dock used for ship works, and Heaven was a ship painter who was using some staging slung over the side of a ship he was painting, supported by ropes. These ropes had previously been damaged and evidence showed that they were unfit for use. The painter was injured. In a summary advanced in relation to a later House of Lords case, Caledonian Railway Co. v. Warwick (1897), Lord Herschell stated that the dry dock's supporting apparatus

Judgment

(Brett MR – minority):

Court of Appeal
The Master of the Rolls, William Brett, 1st Viscount Esher, suggested that there was a wider duty to be responsible in tort to those who might be injured if "ordinary care and skill" was not exercised.

Brett MR's obiter views would later be expressly adopted by Lord Atkin in the House of Lords in Donoghue v Stevenson, when the general concept of a tortious duty of care in negligence was established under English law.

House of Lords
The House of Lords was content to decide the case on the basis that a duty of care was owed by an occupier of land (the owner of the dry dock) to invitees (the employees of the contractor who were on the site to the economic benefit ultimately of the dry dock owner).

References

1883 in case law
English tort case law
1883 in British law
Court of Appeal (England and Wales) cases